Sigismund I may refer to:

Sigismund of Burgundy (died 524), King of the Burgundians
Sigismund I, Prince of Anhalt-Dessau (died 1405)
Sigismund, Holy Roman Emperor (1368–1437)
Sigismund I of Lithuania (c. 1365 – 1440)
Sigismund, Archduke of Austria (1427–1496)
Sigismund of Bavaria (1439–1501), Duke of Bavaria
Sigismund I the Old (1467–1548), King of Poland and Grand Duke of Lithuania

See also 
Sigismund III Vasa (1566–1632), the first (and currently only) Sigismund to have reigned over Sweden
Sigismund (disambiguation)